Matías Santos (born 11 March 1994) is a Uruguayan footballer who plays as a midfielder for U. de Concepción.

References

External links
 

1994 births
Living people
Uruguayan footballers
Uruguayan expatriate footballers
Association football midfielders
Uruguayan Primera División players
Ascenso MX players
Primera Nacional players
Primera B de Chile players
Montevideo Wanderers F.C. players
C.D. Veracruz footballers
Deportivo Pasto footballers
Defensor Sporting players
Nueva Chicago footballers
Montevideo City Torque players
Universidad de Concepción footballers
Expatriate footballers in Chile
Argentine expatriate sportspeople in Chile
Uruguayan expatriate sportspeople in Mexico
Expatriate footballers in Mexico
Uruguayan expatriate sportspeople in Argentina
Expatriate footballers in Argentina